Livada may refer to:

Several places in Bulgaria:
Livada, Burgas, a village in Kameno Municipality, Burgas Province
Several places in Greece:
Livada, Crete, a village in Chania regional unit in Crete
Livada, Tinos, a village on the island of Tinos
Several places in Romania:
 Livada, Satu Mare, a town in Satu Mare County, and its village of Livada Mică
 Livada, Arad, a commune in Arad County
 Livada, a village in Dobârceni Commune, Botoşani County
 Livada and Livada Mică, villages in Grebănu Commune, Buzău County
 Livada, a village in Iclod Commune, Cluj County
 Livada, a village in Petreștii de Jos Commune, Cluj County
 Livada, a village in Tomeşti Commune, Hunedoara County
 Livada, a village in Mera Commune, Vrancea County
Several places in the Republic of Macedonia:
 Livada, Struga, a village in the Struga Municipality